A planetary-mass object (PMO), planemo, or planetary body is, by geophysical definition of celestial objects, any celestial object massive enough to achieve hydrostatic equilibrium (to be rounded under its own gravity), but not enough to sustain core fusion like a star.

The purpose of this term is to refer to a broader range of celestial objects than the concept of planet, since many objects similar in geophysical terms do not conform to typical expectations for a planet. Planetary-mass objects can be quite distinguished in origin and location. Planetary-mass objects include dwarf planets, planetary-mass satellite or free-floating planemos, which may have been ejected from a system (rogue planets) or formed through cloud-collapse rather than accretion (sometimes called sub-brown dwarfs).

Types

Planetary-mass satellite 

The three largest satellites Ganymede, Callisto, and Titan are of similar size or larger than the planet Mercury; these and four more – Io, Moon, Europa, and Triton – are larger than the largest dwarf planet, Pluto. Another dozen smaller satellites are large enough to be round through their own gravity, tidal forces from their parent planets, or both. In particular, Titan has a thick atmosphere and stable bodies of liquid on its surface, like Earth (though for Titan the liquid is methane rather than water). Proponents of the geophysical definition of planets argue that location should not matter and that only geophysical attributes should be taken into account in the definition of a planet. The term satellite planet is sometimes used for planet-sized satellites.

Dwarf planets 
 

A dwarf planet is a planetary-mass object that is neither a true planet nor a natural satellite; it is in direct orbit of a star, and is massive enough for its gravity to compress it into a hydrostatically equilibrious shape (usually a spheroid), but has not cleared the neighborhood of other material around its orbit. Planetary scientist and New Horizons principal investigator Alan Stern, who proposed the term 'dwarf planet', has argued that location should not matter and that only geophysical attributes should be taken into account, and that dwarf planets are thus a subtype of planet. The International Astronomical Union (IAU) accepted the term (rather than the more neutral 'planetoid') but decided to classify dwarf planets as a separate category of object.

Planets and exoplanets

Former stars 

In close binary star systems, one of the stars can lose mass to a heavier companion. Accretion-powered pulsars may drive mass loss. The shrinking star can then become a planetary-mass object. An example is a Jupiter-mass object orbiting the pulsar PSR J1719−1438. These shrunken white dwarfs may become a helium planet or carbon planet.

Sub-brown dwarfs 

Stars form via the gravitational collapse of gas clouds, but smaller objects can also form via cloud collapse. Planetary-mass objects formed this way are sometimes called sub-brown dwarfs. Sub-brown dwarfs may be free-floating such as Cha 110913−773444 and OTS 44, or orbiting a larger object such as 2MASS J04414489+2301513.

Binary systems of sub-brown dwarfs are theoretically possible; Oph 162225-240515 was initially thought to be a binary system of a brown dwarf of 14 Jupiter masses and a sub-brown dwarf of 7 Jupiter masses, but further observations revised the estimated masses upwards to greater than 13 Jupiter masses, making them brown dwarfs according to the IAU working definitions.

Captured planets 
Rogue planets in stellar clusters have similar velocities to the stars and so can be recaptured. They are typically captured into wide orbits between 100 and 105 AU. The capture efficiency decreases with increasing cluster volume, and for a given cluster size it increases with the host/primary mass. It is almost independent of the planetary mass. Single and multiple planets could be captured into arbitrary unaligned orbits, non-coplanar with each other or with the stellar host spin, or pre-existing planetary system.

Rogue planets 

Several computer simulations of stellar and planetary system formation have suggested that some objects of planetary mass would be ejected into interstellar space. 
Such objects are typically called rogue planets.

See also
 Planetary mass
 List of gravitationally rounded objects of the Solar System
 List of Solar System objects by size

References

Planets